Aldersey is a civil parish in Cheshire West and Chester, England.  It contains eleven buildings that are recorded in the National Heritage List for England as designated listed buildings, all of which are at Grade II.  This grade is the lowest of the three gradings given to listed buildings and is applied to "buildings of national importance and special interest".  The parish is entirely rural, and contains the villages of Aldersey Green and Aldersey Park.  Other than a war memorial, all the listed buildings are domestic or related to farming, and most are clustered around Aldersey Green.

References

Listed buildings in Cheshire West and Chester
Lists of listed buildings in Cheshire